Desert Eagle is the eighth studio album by American rapper C-Bo, released November 19, 2002 on Warlock Records. It was produced by Femi Ojetunde & Mike Mosley.

Track listing
"Desert Storm"
"Real Niggaz" (featuring Aobie & Phats Bossi)
"CEO Status" (featuring Cognito & D Buck)
"Go That For Real" (featuring Pizzo)
"Thug Lords" (featuring Jayo Felony & Thug Lordz)
"Break Bread" (featuring Frank Castle)
"M.O.B." (featuring Pizzo)
"Smoke Break (Instrumental)"
"What Cha Need" (featuring Aobie)
"Shitzofrantik" (featuring E-Loc)
"M.O.B." (Remix) (featuring Cognito, D Buck & Pizzo)
"Exhale"

External links
 Desert Eagle at Discogs
 Desert Eagle at Amazon.com

2002 albums
C-Bo albums
Warlock Records albums